King Rat may mean:

Arts and entertainment
 King Rat (1962 novel), a novel by James Clavell set in World War II
 King Rat (film), released in 1965, based on the James Clavell novel
 King Rat (1998 novel), an urban fantasy novel by China Miéville
 "King Rat" (song), a 2 track vinyl promo by Modest Mouse
 King Rat, a traditional character and main antagonist in the pantomime Dick Whittington

Other uses
 King Rat, the head of the Grand Order of Water Rats, a music hall society of Great Britain
 "King Rat", nickname of Billy Wright (loyalist) (1960–1997), Ulster loyalist paramilitary leader during the Troubles in Northern Ireland, and an autobiography he wrote detailing his activities
 Uromys rex, a species of rat

See also
Rat king (disambiguation)